Diospage engelkei is a moth of the subfamily Arctiinae first described by Rothschild in 1909. It is found in South America (the type location is listed as "Onaca, Santa Martha, 2200 ft").

References

Moths described in 1895
Euchromiina